Dermot Kelly  (1918–1980) was an Irish actor often in comic roles, in films and on TV. He achieved popularity as a recurring tramp character, sidekick to Arthur Haynes's vagrant, in TV's The Arthur Haynes Show in the early 1960s. Previously on stage with Dublin's Abbey Theatre, he was in the original stage and film versions of Brendan Behan's The Quare Fellow, in 1954 and 1962, respectively.

Filmography
 Another Shore (1948) as Boxer
 Home is the Hero (1959) as 2nd Pub Customer
 Sally's Irish Rogue (1959) as McKeefry
 Broth of a Boy (1959) as Tim
 Breakout as O'Quinn
 Devil's Bait (1959) as Mr. Love
 Cover Girl Killer (1959) as Pop
 Crooks Anonymous (1962) as Stanley
 The Quare Fellow (1962) as Donnelly
 The Wrong Arm of the Law (1963) as Misery Martin
 Panic (1963) as Murphy
 The Yellow Rolls-Royce (1965) as Marquess of Frinton's Jockey (uncredited)
 Cup Fever (1965) as Bodger the Bootmender
 The Plank (1967) as Milkman
 Mrs. Brown, You've Got a Lovely Daughter (1968) as Con Man
 Headline Hunters (1968) as Ernie
 Subterfuge (1968) as Van Driver
 Staircase (1969) as Gravedigger

References

External links
 

1918 births
1980 deaths
20th-century Irish male actors
Irish male stage actors
Irish male film actors
Irish male television actors